Bolivia–Argentina pipeline may refer to:

 Yabog pipeline
 Gasoducto Noreste Argentino

Argentina–Bolivia relations